Stal Kraśnik is a Polish football club based in Kraśnik. They currently play in III liga, group IV, the fourth tier of the Polish football league.

History
Stal Kraśnik was formed in 1948 as Klub Sportowy Metal. On 16 September 1951, club changed its name to Stal. In the 1956 season, club gained promotion to the third tier of the Polish football league for the first time in its history. In the 1960–61 Stal won the regional championship, and qualified to the promotion playoffs, but lost in the final round. In 1962, Stal Kraśnik reached the round of 16 of the Polish Cup, after defeating I liga team Odra Opole 1–0, in front of 8,000 fans.

In the 1966–67 season Stal reached their highest ever league position of second in the reformed third tier, at one point behind the winners Włókniarz Pabianice. They have spent sixteen seasons in the III liga, most recently in 2001–02.

Stadium
The club play their home matches at Stadion MOSiR w Kraśniku (Kraśnik MOSiR Stadium), which has a capacity of 1,960. The record attendance for a football match in Kraśnik was on 30 April 1967 when a crowd of 15,000 attended Stal's 0–2 loss to Motor Lublin.

References

External links
 

Football clubs in Poland
Association football clubs established in 1951
Football clubs in Lublin Voivodeship
1951 establishments in Poland